Orchard Portman is a village and civil parish in Somerset, England, situated  south of Taunton in the Somerset West and Taunton district.  The village has a population of 150.

The parish includes the hamlet of Thurlbear and the nearby Thurlbear Wood and Quarrylands Site of Special Scientific Interest. St Thomas' church in Thurlbear is home to the heaviest complete set (cast together at the same time) of four church bells in the world.

History

The estate was known as Orceard and was given by King Æthelwulf of Wessex to Taunton's minster church in 854.

The parish of Thurlbear was part of the North Curry Hundred, while Orchard Portman was part of the Taunton Deane Hundred.

By 1135 the manor had passed to Elfric de Orchard and his descendants one of whom, Christina de Orchard, married Walter Portman. The village takes the second part of its name from the Portman family one of the earliest prominent members of which was Sir William Portman (died 1557), Chief Justice of the King’s Bench and lord of the manor. The estate was sold to the Commissioners of Crown Lands in 1944.

Governance
The parish council has responsibility for local issues, including setting an annual precept (local rate) to cover the council’s operating costs and producing annual accounts for public scrutiny. The parish council evaluates local planning applications and works with the local police, district council officers, and neighbourhood watch groups on matters of crime, security, and traffic. The parish council's role also includes initiating projects for the maintenance and repair of parish facilities, as well as consulting with the district council on the maintenance, repair, and improvement of highways, drainage, footpaths, public transport, and street cleaning. Conservation matters (including trees and listed buildings) and environmental issues are also the responsibility of the council.

The village falls within the non-metropolitan district of Somerset West and Taunton, which was established on 1 April 2019. It was previously in the district of Taunton Deane, which was formed on 1 April 1974 under the Local Government Act 1972, and part of Taunton Rural District before that. The district council is responsible for local planning and building control, local roads, council housing, environmental health, markets and fairs, refuse collection and recycling, cemeteries and crematoria, leisure services, parks, and tourism.

Somerset County Council is responsible for running the largest and most expensive local services such as education, social services, libraries, main roads, public transport, policing and fire services, trading standards, waste disposal and strategic planning.

It is also part of the Taunton Deane county constituency represented in the House of Commons of the Parliament of the United Kingdom. It elects one Member of Parliament (MP) by the first past the post system of election.

Religious sites
The parish church of St Thomas at Thurlbear shows clear signs of the Norman church upon which later structures were built. Pevsner cites the Norman arcades and narrow aisles characteristic of that era and "never enlarged to satisfy later medieval taste." He dates the church to "hardly later than c. 1110." The Churches Conservation Trust launched a programme of repairs at the church, with the Somerset County Council conducting an archaeological recording and survey in conjunction with these efforts.

The Church of St Michael in Orchard Portman also has Norman origins with the chancel being rebuilt in the early 15th century. It formed part of the former Portman family mansion on the site. The Portman chapel was erected as the south aisle around 1450, demolished in 1844 and rebuilt again in 1910. The tower was rebuilt in 1521. Dr Thomas Bond (1841–1901) a British physician considered by some to be the first offender profiler, and best known for his association with the notorious Jack the Ripper murders of 1888, was buried in the churchyard.

Sport
Orchard Portman is the location of Taunton Racecourse which is used for thoroughbred horse racing, as well as a small cricket field.

References

Villages in Taunton Deane
Civil parishes in Somerset